Científicos Industria Argentina is an Argentine television program. It describes the news about science and technology in Argentina.

Awards
 2014 Martín Fierro Awards: Best cultural program.

Televisión Pública original programming
Argentine educational television series